Chicoreus microphyllus, common name the curly murex,  is a species of sea snail, a marine gastropod mollusk in the family Muricidae, the murex snails or rock snails.

Description
The size of an adult shell varies between 35 mm and 124 mm.

Distribution
This species is widespread through the Indo-West Pacific region.

References

 Jousseaume, F., 1881. Etude des Purpuridae et description d'espèces nouvelles. Revue et Magasin de Zoologie Pure et Appliquée 7("1879"): 315-348
 Dautzenberg, Ph. (1929). Mollusques testacés marins de Madagascar. Faune des Colonies Francaises, Tome III
 Liu, J.Y. [Ruiyu] (ed.). (2008). Checklist of marine biota of China seas. China Science Press. 1267 pp.
 Houart, R., 1992. The genus Chicoreus and related genera (Gastropoda: Muricidae) in the Indo-West Pacific. Mémoires du Muséum national d'Histoire naturelle 154(A): 1-188

External links
 Jousseaume, F., 1881. Diagnoses de mollusques nouveaux. Le Naturaliste 3(44): 349-350
 

Muricidae
Gastropods described in 1816